"What dreams may come" is a quote from the "To be, or not to be" soliloquy from the play Hamlet by William Shakespeare.

"What Dreams May Come" may refer to:

 What Dreams May Come, an 1888 novel by Gertrude Atherton
 What Dreams May Come (Matheson novel), a 1978 fantasy novel by Richard Matheson
 What Dreams May Come (film), a 1998 adaptation of the novel
 What Dreams May Come (Wellman novel), a 1983 supernatural detective novel by Manly Wade Wellman
 "What Dreams May Come", a 1998 episode of the animated TV series Godzilla: The Series